Faust House may refer to:

Czech Republic
 Faust House (Prague), a historic building in Prague

United States
Alphabetical by state, then town
 Faust House (Helena-West Helena, Arkansas), listed on the National Register of Historic Places (NRHP)
 Gemmill-Faust House, West Helena, Arkansas, NRHP-listed
 Thomas Faust House, NRHP-listed in Homestead, Florida
 Faust Houses and Outbuildings, NRHP-listed in Oglethorpe County, Georgia
 Faust-Ryan House, NRHP-listed in King County, Washington

See also
 Hotel Faust, New Braunfels, Texas, US